The Commercial Vehicle Show takes place every year in April at the NEC Birmingham since 2000.

2013

Dates: 9–13 April

 Citroen Berlingo Electric
 Citroën Dispatch Crew Van
 DAF CF 510
 DAF LF 150 
 DAF LF 220
 DAF XF Euro 6
 Fiat Doblo Cargo
 Fiat Doblo XL
 Fiat Ducato Tipper
 Fiat Fiorino Cargo
 Fiat Scudo Cargo 
 Fiat Scudo Crew Cab
 Fiat Work Up
 Ford Fiesta Van ECOnetic
 Ford Transit Courier
 Ford Transit Connect
 Ford Transit Custom 
 Ford Transit Two-Tonne
 Fuso Canter Eco Hybrid
 Hino 300 Series
 Hino 700 Series
 MAN TGX
 Mercedes-Benz Antos
 Mercedes-Benz Arocs
 Mercedes-Benz Atego 823
 Mercedes-Benz Citan
 Mercedes-Benz Vito Effect
 Mercedes-Benz Unimog
 Mini Clubvan
 Nissan Cabstar
 Nissan e-NV200 Concept
 Nissan NV200
 Nissan NV200 Taxi
 Nissan NV400
 Isuzu D-Max Double Cab
 Isuzu D-Max "Eiger" Double Cab
 Isuzu D-Max "Yukon" Double Cab
 Isuzu D-Max "Utah" Double Cab
 Isuzu Euro V EEV Forward
 IVECO Eurocargo
 IVECO Stralis
 Volvo FH
 Volvo FM 370 6x2
 Volvo FM 410 4x2

References

External links
 

Auto shows in the United Kingdom
Recurring events established in 2000
2000 establishments in the United Kingdom
April events
Events in Birmingham, West Midlands